The NFA Hillier Senior Cup is a football knockout tournament involving teams from Northamptonshire, England and the surrounding area. It is a County Cup competition of the Northamptonshire Football Association and involves senior non-league teams. It has been contested annually (but for a few sporadic gaps) since 1883. Kettering Town have won the cup the most times, lifting the trophy on 31 occasions. The current champions are Peterborough Sports, who beat Rushden & Diamonds in the final in April 2022.

History
Initially named the NFA Senior Cup, the tournament was renamed in 1981. It was first held in 1883, and was won by Newport Pagnell. The trophy has since been lifted by 24 different sides (not including reserve teams). While Football League clubs Peterborough United and Northampton Town have contested in the past, the majority of entrants are from the lower-leagues of English football. The winner of the competition now contests the Maunsell Cup against one of Peterborough or Northampton.

Recent winners

References

External links 
 NFA Hillier Cup page

Football in Northamptonshire
County Cup competitions
Recurring sporting events established in 1883